is a Japanese actor. He is best known for his role as Hoji Tomasu/Deka Blue in the 2004 TV series Tokusou Sentai Dekaranger.

Filmography

TV series
 Kunimitsu no Matsuri (KTV, 2003, ep10-11)
 Marusa!! (Fuji TV, 2003, ep9)
 Onsen e Iko! 4 (TBS, 2003)
 Sky High (TV Asahi, 2003, ep7)
 Stand Up!! (TBS, 2003, ep4,6)
 Hamano Shizuka wa Jiken ga Osuki (Fuji TV, 2004, ep2)
 Tokusou Sentai Dekaranger (TV Asahi, 2004- 2005  ) – Hoji Tomasu/Deka Blue
 Astro Kyudan (TV Asahi, 2005) – Uno Kyuichi
 H2 (TBS, 2005) – Tsukigata
 Tantei Boogie (探偵ブギ) (TV Tokyo, 2006, ep3)
 Galileo (Fuji TV, 2007) – Murase Kensuke
 Kamen Rider Den-O (TV Asahi, 2007, ep30)
 Onna Keiji Mizuki 2 (TV Asahi, 2007, ep11)
 Shukan Akagawa Jiro (週刊 赤川次郎) (TV Tokyo, 2007, ep6-10)
 ROOKIES (TBS, 2008, ep6-8,10-11)
 Egoist (Fuji TV, 2009)
 Mr. Brain (TBS, 2009, ep7

Film
 Tokusou Sentai Dekaranger The Movie: Full Blast Action (2004) – Hoji Tomasu/Deka Blue
 Tokusou Sentai Dekaranger vs. Abaranger (2005) – Hoji Tomasu/Deka Blue
 Mahou Sentai Magiranger vs. Dekaranger (2006) – Hoji Tomasu/Deka Blue
 Shiawase no Switch (2006)
 Giniro no Season (2007)
 Tsubaki Sanjuro (2007)

Dubbing
Power Rangers S.P.D. (2005, 2011) – Sky Tate/SPD Blue Ranger

References

1982 births
Living people
Japanese male television actors
Japanese male film actors
People from Kobe